Tokologo Local Municipality is an administrative area in the Lejweleputswa District of the Free State in South Africa. The name is a Setswana word meaning "freedom".

Main places
The 2001 census divided the municipality into the following main places:

Politics 

The municipal council consists of eight members elected by mixed-member proportional representation. Four councillors are elected by first-past-the-post voting in four wards, while the remaining four are chosen from party lists so that the total number of party representatives is proportional to the number of votes received. In the elections of 1 November 2021 the African National Congress (ANC) won a majority of 8 seats on the council.
The following table shows the results of the election.

References

External links
 Official website

Local municipalities of the Lejweleputswa District Municipality